is a Japanese photographer.

Publications
We Have No Place to Be. Soshisha, 1982.
Expanded edition. Session, 2020. With an essay by Yoshitomo Nara.
Seventeen's Map. Bungeishunju, 1988.
Zoo. Joho Center Shuppan kyoku, 1989.
Father. Bungeishunju, 1990.
Berlin. Ota Shuppan, 1992.
Couple. Bungeishunju, 1992.
Work 1991-1995. Media Factory, 1996.
Children's Time. Shogakukan, 1999.
Dream. Media Factory, 1997.
Freedom 1981-1989. Kadokawa Shoten, 1998.
Seventeen 2001-2006. Iwanami Shoten, 2008.
Hof Memories of Berlin. Iwanami Shoten, 2011.

References

Japanese photographers
1949 births
Living people
Place of birth missing (living people)